Denny High School in Scotland is a non-denominational public secondary school. The school was opened in 1959, and moved to a new building in February 2009. The new school contains a gymnasium, swimming pool and drama studio. The school serves an area of  around the area of Denny, Falkirk, including Bonnybridge, Dunipace, Banknock and Dennyloanhead. In 2004, Denny High School had a roll of 1316 pupils and 95 teachers. It also employed 34 non-teaching staff.

Alumni 

 David Marshall (born 1941), Member of Parliament (MP) for Glasgow Shettleston 1979–2005, Glasgow East 2005–08
 Andrew D. Taylor (born 1950)  Director of the Science and Technology Facilities Council (STFC)
 Karine Polwart (born 1970), singer-songwriter and folk musician

References

Secondary schools in Falkirk (council area)
Denny, Falkirk